Khibiny

 code name for a Russian radioelectronic jamming system
 which in turn was named after the Khibiny Mountains